Cambridge, Ontario City Council consists of the Mayor of Cambridge, Ontario, two regional councillors and 8 ward councillors.

Councillors
As of the 2022 Waterloo Region municipal elections

 Mayor - Jan Liggett
 Regional councillor - Doug Craig 
 Regional councillor - Pam Wolf
 Ward 1 - Donna Reid (Blair, Preston Heights, Silver Heights)
 Ward 2 - Mike Devine (Hespeler) 
 Ward 3 - Corey Klimpson (Preston) 
 Ward 4 - Ross Earnshaw (Greenway-Chaplin, East Galt)
 Ward 5 - Sheri Roberts (Blair Road, Southwood) 
 Ward 6 - Adam Cooper (Christopher-Champlain) 
 Ward 7 - Scott Hamilton (Littles Corners, Allison) 
 Ward 8 - Nicholas Ermeta (Fiddlesticks)

References

 Cambridge City Council

Municipal councils in Ontario
Politics of Cambridge, Ontario